Woodwardopterus is a genus of prehistoric eurypterid, or sea scorpion, classified as part of the family Mycteroptidae.

The genus contains one confirmed species, W. scabrosus, from the Carboniferous of Glencartholm, Scotland. Originally classified as Eurypterus scabrosus, it was later found to be generically distinct and placed as a member of the family Mycteroptidae. Later in 2005, was assigned to its own genus, and linked to a new own family, Woodwardopteridae inside Mycteropoidea, probably as a sister taxon of Megarachne.

A possible second species, ?W. freemanorum, was named in 2021 and comes from the Changhsingian (Late Permian) beds of the Baralaba Coal Measures, Bowen Basin, central Queensland, Australia. This possible second species is important due to be the geologically youngest eurypterid discovered (at least 11 Ma younger than any previously known relative), showing that large sweep-feeding eurypterids persisted until the end-Permian extinction in the southern high latitudes of Gondwana. W. freemanorum was described by Andrew Rozefelds of Queensland Museum (also adjunct associate at Central Queensland University) and German expert Markus Poschmann of the Generaldirektion Kulturelles Erbe RLP. After being taken to the Queensland museum for identification in 2013, it was subsequently dated as being 252 million years old. Later research showed that this specimen was the last known eurypterid in the world, having lived not long before the end of Permian extinction event, in which around 96 per cent of all species went extinct.

See also 
 List of eurypterids

References

Stylonurina
Carboniferous eurypterids
Eurypterids of Europe